Harrow Way Community School is a coeducational community secondary school. It is located on the historic Harrow Way in Andover, in the English county of Hampshire.
 
It is administered by Hampshire County Council which coordinates the schools admissions. Harrow Way has also gained specialist status as a Maths and Computing College. The school offers GCSEs, BTECs and other level 1 and 2 courses as programmes of study for pupils.

History
Harrow Way School was opened in September 1967.

Heads:
 1967-88: Alan Garner
 1988-2004: Chris Overton
 2004-11: Charlie Currie
 2011-12: Mark Warren, acting head
 2012–Present: Michael Serridge

Ofsted judgements
The school was visited by Ofsted in 1995, 2000, 2002, 2007, 2013 & 2017. The most recent judgement gave the school a 'Good' rating. In 2015, Harrow Way was one of the fifty most improved schools in England.

Trivia
Pupils from Harrow Way Community School were used as extras for the 1981 BBC television series Codename Icarus.

References

External links

Secondary schools in Hampshire
Andover, Hampshire
Community schools in Hampshire